In telecommunication, speed of service is the time for a message to be received. For example:
The time between release of a message by the originator to receipt of the message by the addressee, as perceived by the end user.  (originator-to-recipient speed of service)
The time between entry of a message into a communications system and receipt of the message at the terminating communications facility, i.e., the communications facility serving the addressee, as measured by the system.

References

Telecommunications engineering